The Campeonato Nacional de Boxeo Playa Girón or Torneo Playa Girón is the  yearly Cuban amateur boxing championship. A group of boxers represent each Cuban province, with the winner in each weight class being declared the national champion. The province whose boxers obtain the best results wins the tournament as well.. The first edition took place in March of 1962. Currently, the tournament is held every December and it is recognized by AIBA. The tournament is held at the Playa Girón beach, in Matanzas.

5-time champions
The following is a list of boxers who have won the tournament 5 or more times. Boldface denotes active boxers.

See also
Amateur boxing
Boxing in Cuba

References 

Boxing competitions
Boxing in Cuba